Linda Verde (born 27 February 1950) is a Norwegian orienteering competitor. She received a  silver medal at the 1974 World Orienteering Championships.

She became Nordic champion in 1975 with the Norwegian relay team.

National championships
Linda Verde is several times Norwegian champion. She won the classic distance in 1974, 1975, and 1981. She won the long distance in 1974, 1975, and 1977. She received a gold medal in night orienteering in 1979.

References

1950 births
Living people
Norwegian orienteers
Female orienteers
Foot orienteers
World Orienteering Championships medalists
20th-century Norwegian women
21st-century Norwegian women